State Route 587 (SR 587) is a north–south state route in the northwestern quadrant of the U.S. state of Ohio. Its northern terminus is at a T-intersection with SR 18 in the southeastern corner of the city of Fostoria.

Route description
SR 587 is located in the extreme northern portion of Wyandot County and the southwestern quadrant of Seneca County.  This highway is not included as a component of the National Highway System, a network of highways deemed most important for the country's economy, mobility and defense.

History
SR 587 was designated in 1937. In 1965, the portion of SR 587 southeast of McCutchenville was removed from the state highway system. Jurisdiction of this stretch of roadway was transferred to Wyandot County, who then designated it as County Road 35.

Major intersections

References

587
Transportation in Seneca County, Ohio
Transportation in Wyandot County, Ohio